ToHeart may refer to:
 To Heart, Japanese visual novel and anime
ToHeart (band), Korean band